Six Flags Hurricane Harbor Phoenix is a water park located in Phoenix, Arizona. It is located in North Phoenix at Adobe Dam Regional Park.

History
WaterWorld Safari originally opened on the site of Wet'n'Wild Phoenix. After Village Roadshow Limited invested over $30 million in the park on ownership, and new attractions, Wet'n'Wild Phoenix opened its doors to the public July 1, 2009. At opening the park had over 30 rides. In November 2013, CNL Lifestyle Properties purchased Wet'n'Wild Phoenix from Village Roadshow, along with the rights for the Wet'n'Wild brand in the United States. CNL Lifestyle Properties previously purchased Wet'n'Wild Hawaii from Village Roadshow, with both properties set to be operated by Premier Parks, LLC from the 2014 season.

Management of the park was subsequently taken over by Six Flags and in 2019 it changed its name to Six Flags Hurricane Harbor Phoenix.

Due to concerns of the COVID-19 pandemic, Six Flags announced a suspension of operations across the company on March 13, 2020. Six Flags Hurricane Harbor Phoenix was scheduled to open for the 2020 season a day later on March 14. The water park opened the 2020 season on June 12, the first Six Flags water park to do so with new rules and regulations. By June 29, the state government made an order that water parks that were currently operating in the state, had to close again due to the uprising in COVID-19 cases in the state. In early August, Six Flags announced that the rest of the 2020 operating season had been canceled and that Six Flags Hurricane Harbor Phoenix looks forward to open again in 2021. The water park reopened again, the following season on March 13, 2021.

Rides

Thrill
Anaconda
Bahama Blaster
Bonzai Pipelines
Mammoth Falls
Tornado
Typhoon Twister/Serpentine Complex

Family
Adventure River (lazy river)
Big Kahuna
Hurricane Bay
Paradise Island
Wahoo Racers

Kids
Coconut Bay
Soak 'em Playground
Splash Island
Splashwater Beach

References

Water parks in Arizona
2009 establishments in Arizona
Buildings and structures in Phoenix, Arizona
Tourist attractions in Phoenix, Arizona